Zaynab, also spelled as Zainab, Zayneb, Zeinab, Zenab, Zineb, Zinab, Zynab, Zaineb. is an Arabic female given name meaning "a fragrant tree". 

Zaynab is the name of a daughter and a granddaughter of the Islamic prophet Muhammad and two of his wives: Zaynab bint Jahsh and Zaynab bint Khuzayma.

In 2021, the Chicago Tribune found that Zeinab was the most popular name for girls among names unusually frequent in Michigan, "17.2 times more common than nationwide."

Bosnian forms of the name are "Zeineb", "Zejneb" and "Zejneba", the Somali form of the name is Seynab, and the Turkish form is Zeynep.

People 
 Zaynab al-Awadiya, medieval physician
 Zainab Ahmad, American prosecutor
 Zainab Ahmed, Nigerian politician
 Zainab bint Muhammad, daughter of Khadijah bint Khuwaylid and Muhammad. Mother of Umamah wife of Ali Ibn Abi Talib.
 Zaynab bint Ali, daughter of Ali ibn Abi Talib, the sister of Husayn ibn Ali, and granddaughter of Muhammad
 Zaynab bint Khuzayma, a wife of Muhammad
 Zaynab bint Jahsh, a wife of Muhammad
 Zainab Chottani
 Zainab Cobbold, Anglo-Scot convert to Islam
 Zainab Fasiki
 Zeynab Jalalian, a Kurdish Iranian, often described as a political activist
 Zaynab an-Nafzawiyyat, an influential figure in the Almoravid movement
 Zeinab Badawi, Sudanese-British television and radio journalist for the BBC
Zainab Khawla (born 1969), Syrian politician
Zainab al-Khawaja, Bahraini human rights activist
 Zainab Tari (a queen of Sindh)
 Zainab Masood, a character in the British TV soap opera EastEnders
 Zainab Biisheva (1908–1996), Bashkir poet and writer
 Zeynab bint Al-Harith, Jewish woman that poisoned Muhammad

References

Arabic feminine given names
Pakistani feminine given names